The 2003–04 Iraqi Premier League kicked off on January 8, 2004. The name of the league was changed from Iraqi First Division to Iraqi Premier League. Due to security issues and scheduling difficulties, the season was officially cancelled in June 2004 during the group stage.

The top four teams from each group were meant to advance to the elite stage, which would be followed by semi-finals, a third place match and a final, with the champions and runners-up qualifying for the 2005 AFC Champions League and the third and fourth-placed teams qualifying for the 2004–05 Arab Champions League.

As the league was not completed, the Iraq Football Association (IFA) decided that a play-off would be held between the top four teams from the Central Groups to decide which two sides would qualify for the AFC Champions League, on the assumption that the leaders of the North and South Groups at the time of cancellation (Erbil and Al-Najaf) would be able to take part in the Arab Champions League along with Al-Talaba, who were specially invited to compete.

Al-Shorta and Al-Zawraa were the teams to qualify to the AFC Champions League, but no teams were admitted to the Arab Champions League after Iraq withdrew from the tournament following UAFA's decision to only let them have one participant in Al-Talaba.

Name changes
Al-Difaa Al-Jawi renamed to Al-Estiqlal.

Group stage at abandonment

North Group

Central Group 1

Central Group 2

South Group

Additional play-offs for AFC Champions League

Al-Zawraa qualified for the 2005 AFC Champions League.

Al-Shorta won 4–3 on aggregate and qualified for the 2005 AFC Champions League.

Season statistics

Hat-tricks

References

External links
 Iraq Football Association

Iraqi Premier League seasons
1
Iraq